The 2022 Big East Conference baseball tournament was held at Prasco Park in Mason, Ohio, from May 26 through 29. The event, held at the end of the conference regular season, determined the champion of the Big East Conference for the 2022 season.  For the fifth time, UConn won the double-elimination tournament and received the conference's automatic bid to the 2022 NCAA Division I baseball tournament.

Format and seeding
The tournament will use a double-elimination format and feature the top four finishers of the Big East's eight teams.

Bracket

Game results

All-Tournament Team
The following players were named to the All-Tournament Team.

Most Valuable Player
Luke Franzoni was named Tournament Most Valuable Player.  Franzoni was a senior first baseman for Xavier.

References

Tournament
Big East Conference Baseball Tournament
Big East baseball tournament
College baseball tournaments in Ohio
Sports competitions in Mason, Ohio